"Don't Stop Believin'" is a 1981 song by Journey.

Don't Stop Believing or Don't Stop Believin' may refer to:

Don't Stop Believin' 
[[Don't Stop Believin' (album)|Don't Stop Believin''' (album)]], a 1976 album by Olivia Newton-John
"Don't Stop Believin (Olivia Newton-John song), the album's title song
"Don't Stop Believin (Degrassi: The Next Generation), an episode of Degrassi: The Next GenerationDon't Stop Believin': Everyman's Journey, a 2012 documentary film about the band Journey
[[Don't Stop Believin' (TV series)|Don't Stop Believin' (TV series)]], a 2012 Singapore TV series
"Don't Stop Believin'", a song by Stage Dolls from their self-titled album Stage Dolls''
"Don't Stop Believin': The Man, The Band and the Song that Inspired Generations", a 2018 memoir by Journey keyboardist, Jonathan Cain

Don't Stop Believing
 "Don't Stop Believing" (Mariette song), 2015 Mariette Hansson song for Melodifestivalen 2015
 Don't Stop Believing (TV series), a British talent show

See also
 Don't Stop (disambiguation)